Beer Island is an island in the South Pacific,  long, lying close to The Niblets and immediately south of Jagged Island and  west of Prospect Point, off the west coast of Graham Land. It was charted and named by the British Graham Land Expedition under John Rymill, 1934–37.

See also 
 List of Antarctic and sub-Antarctic islands

References 

Islands of Graham Land
Graham Coast